Aufklärungsgruppe 123 (123st Reconnaissance Group) was a Luftwaffe air reconnaissance group that participated in World War II.

Citations

References

Luftwaffe Wings
Air force reconnaissance units and formations
Military units and formations disestablished in 1945